is a train station located in Adachi, Tokyo, Japan.

Lines 

Tokyo Metropolitan Bureau of Transportation
Nippori-Toneri Liner

Platforms

History 
The station opened on 30 March 2008, when the Nippori-Toneri Liner began operation.

Station numbering was introduced in November 2017 with the station receiving station number NT13.

References

External links
Toei Minumadai-shinsuikoen Station 

Railway stations in Tokyo
Railway stations in Japan opened in 2008
Nippori-Toneri Liner